Soňa Valentová (later Hasprová; 3 June 1946 – 10 December 2022) was a Slovak actress. She starred in the 1969/1970 film Witchhammer under director Otakar Vávra. She was born in Trnava.

Valentová died on 10 December 2022, at the age of 76.

References

External links

1946 births
2022 deaths
20th-century Slovak actresses
Actors from Trnava
Slovak film actresses
Merited Artists of Czechoslovakia